Jhang is the capital city of Jhang District, in the central portion of the province of Punjab, Pakistan. Situated on the east bank of the Chenab river, it is the 18th largest city of Pakistan by population.

The historical name of the city and district is Jhang Sial.

The locality also includes the Shrine (Darbar) of Pir Abdul Rehman hrine of Sultan Bahu and Heer and Ranjha's Tomb.

Etymology
The historical name of the city and district is Jhang Sial.

The word Jhang is derived from the Sanskrit word jāṅgala which means rough or forested terrain, the word Jungle also sharing the same root. In context, the term Jhang was derived from the Sanskrit word jāṅgala, Jhang Sial being the historic name of the locality, literally translating into ‘The terrain of the Sials’.

History

Greeks army led by Alexander encamped here in Jhang and stayed some time to make preparation to proceed ahead, several local tribes like Vains, Longs, Nauls and Noons are described to be the descendants of the Alexander's army men.

Muhammad bin Qasim conquered nearby city of Multan, so area of Jhang came under Arabs for few centuries. Then town of Jhang became part of Multan province of Mamluks ruled by different rulers.

The history of Jhang is the history of the Sial tribe.

Jhang was built in 1288 by Maharaja Rai Sial, a Rajput chief and founder of the Sial Tribe.

The Sial tribe, his kin, ruled this district ever since until the last Sial ruler of Jhang, Ahmad Khan (1812 to 1822) was defeated by Ranjit Singh after fierce fighting.

Under the collective rule of the Sial Khans of Jhang and other Sial sub-tribes such as the Rajbana and Bharwana, in the zenith of their power, the Sial country of Jhang extended up to the Muzafargarh boundary in the south, and the entirety of Chiniot, Kamalia and Kabirwala .  The territory extended to parts of Bhakkar and Sargodha. The Garh Mahraja and Ahmadpur Sial  were added to the possessions of the Rajbana Sial tribe who drove out the Baloch tribes to the Thal and defeated the Nawab of Multan by the mid 17th century.

Maghiana lies on the edge of the highlands, overlooking the alluvial valley of the Chenab, while the older town of Jhang occupies the lowlands at its foot.

Geography 
Jhang is situated at the East bank of Chenab which has confluence with Jhelum at Trimmu Barrage near the town of Athara Hazari. The city was endangered in the 2014 floods but it was not flooded as the flood water was redirected towards Athara Hazari. there are three river in jhang such as chenab river jhelum river and river ravi is also touch with the boundary of District Jhang near ahmad pur sial.

Demographics
The population of city in 1998 Census of Pakistan was recorded as 293,366. According to the 2017 Census of Pakistan, the population of city had risen to 414,131 with a growth of 41.17% in 19 years.

Administration
Jhang Saddar is the administrative center of Jhang Tehsil (a subdivision of the district). The tehsil itself is divided into 55 Union councils.

Education
 Virtual University of Pakistan (Jhang Campus)
 Lahore College for Women University (Jhang Campus)
 University of Veterinary and Animal Sciences (Jhang Campus)
 Government Post Graduate College
 Chenab College Jhang
 University of Jhang
 Punjab Group of Colleges
 Superior Group of Colleges
 Dar-e-Arqam Schools
 Cambridge Grammar School
 Beaconhouse School System
 The City School

Notable people

Scientists
 Abdus Salam, first Pakistani Nobel Laureate.
 Yash Pal, Indian scientist.
 Har Gobind Khorana, Indian American biochemist

Politicians 
 Khan Muhammad Arif Khan Rajbana Sial, former federal and provincial minister, honourable Chief Whip of All-India Muslim League, close associate of the Quaid-e-Azam and key figure in the Independence Movement of Pakistan. 
 Syeda Abida Hussain, former Pakistani Ambassador to USA and federal minister. 
 Makhdoom Faisal Saleh Hayat, former Interior Minister of Pakistan and FIFA official.
 Sahibzada Nazir Sultan, former Member National Assembly.
 Sahibzada Mahboob Sultan, federal minister.
 Ghulam Bibi Bharwana, Member National Assembly.
 Najaf Abbas Sial, former Member National Assembly and Member Provincial Assembly.
 Sheikh Waqas Akram, former minister of state for Labour and Manpower
 Haq Nawaz Jhangvi, Pakistani cleric, founder of Sipah-e-Sahaba Pakistan and namesake of Lashkar-e-Jhangvi
 Masroor Nawaz Jhangvi, Pakistani Islamic cleric and politician, Member of Provincial Assembly (MPA) Punjab, son of Haq Nawaz Jhangvi

Sports personalities 
 Aleem Dar, cricketer and umpire
 Ghulam Shabber, UAE cricket player

Literary personalities 
Majeed Amjad, Urdu poet
 Nasir Abbas Nayyar, Pakistani Urdu language columnist
 Ishtiaq Ahmad (fiction writer)

Pirs/religious figures 
 Sultan Bahu, founder of the Sarwari Qadiri Sufi order
 Shah Jeewna, Sufi saint, founder of Qalandariyya order

Business people 
 Sheikh Waqas Akram, founder of Shalimar Transport

Sister Cities 
Jhang have 1 sister city

 Madera, California

Geographic location
Jhang Sadr is a city in Punjab, Pakistan. It is located 31.27 latitude and 72.33 longitude and it is situated at elevation of 158 meters above sea level.

References

External links
Punjab Government ghail pur (Jhang District profile)
Jhang Portal
Jhang Portal
Jhang Portal

Cities in Punjab (Pakistan)
Jhang District
Populated places in Jhang District
Populated places established in the 15th century
Populated places in Punjab, Pakistan